Amro Abdelfatah Ali Surag (born 8 April 1998) is a Qatari professional footballer who plays as a winger for Qatar Stars League side Al-Gharafa.

Career statistics

Club

Notes

International goals

References

External links
Amro Surag at Eurosport
Amro Surag at Soccerway

1998 births
Living people
Qatari footballers
Association football wingers
Al-Gharafa SC players
Qatar Stars League players